Majid or majeed may refer to:

Given name

Majid Khan (cricketer) (born 1946), Pakistani Athlete
Majid Ansari (born 1954) Iranian Cleric
Majid Al Mohandis (born 1971) Iraqi Singer
Majid Hosseini (born 1996), Iranian Athlete

Arts and entertainment
Majid (film), a 2010 Moroccan film
Majid (rapper) (born 1975), a Danish rapper of Moroccan-Berber origin
Majid Jordan, a Canadian R&B duo
Majid (comics), a pan-Arab comic book anthology and children's magazine

Other uses
Majid (name), or variant spellings, including a list of people with the given name or family name
Majid, Iran (disambiguation), a number of places in Iran
Majeed syndrome, an inherited skin disorder

See also

Majd (disambiguation)
Majidae, a family of crabs